Showsani (also Romanized as Showsanī; also known as Shāh Hasan and Shāh Ḩasanī) is a village in Rostam-e Yek Rural District, in the Central District of Rostam County, Fars Province, Iran. At the 2006 census, its population was 1,172, in 283 families.

References 

Populated places in Rostam County